Ypióca Group is a Brazilian traditional manufacturer of cachaça located in the state of Ceará. The Ypióca Group consists of seven companies which include mineral water production and farming. 

In May 2012, Diageo agreed to acquire the Ypióca brand for $450 million; the deal closed by the end of 2012.

It is the oldest continuously active private company in Brazil.

Products
The Group has many products, most of which use the name Ypióca followed by a name (like Ypióca Gold, Ypióca Crystal, Ypioca 150 etc.). Sapupara is the name of another famous product of the Group, being sold with the names Sapupara Ouro (gold) and Sapupara Prata (silver).

There are also many other Ypióca Group products, like mixed drinks (Ypióca Limão, Sapupara Limão), wines (Catuaba Garanhão and Catuaba Vinhagrinha) and Naturágua, a famous mineral water brand in Ceará.

Production
The Group has five production plants, with its own fields for production of sugar cane, located in the countryside of the states of Ceará. 

In the transformation and distillation of the sugarcane, the Ypióca Group uses technology imported from England and Scotland. For aging, the group uses the traditional wooden barrels.

Museum

References

External links
 Official site  - (It starts in Portuguese but can be changed to English).
 Ypióca´s Cachaça Museum Site

Companies based in Ceará
Alcohol in Brazil
Brazilian brands
Diageo brands
Drink companies of Brazil